Salmanlu (also Romanized as Salmānlū; also known as Salmālu, Salman, and Salmānū) is a village in Mojezat Rural District, in the Central District of Zanjan County, Zanjan Province, Iran. At the 2006 census, its population was 105, in 26 families.

References 

Populated places in Zanjan County